The Men's scratch at the 2013 UCI Track Cycling World Championships was held on February 21. 23 athletes participated in the contest.

Medalists

Results
The race was held at 20:35.

References

2013 UCI Track Cycling World Championships
UCI Track Cycling World Championships – Men's scratch